The National Catholic Forensic League (NCFL) is a speech and debate league that was formed in 1951. It is organized into regions that correspond to Roman Catholic dioceses. Member schools include both public and parochial high schools. The NCFL recruits member schools in both the United States and Canada. As of January, 2011, there were 65 active dioceses with NCFL leagues.  The IRS recognizes the NCFL as an organization eligible to receive tax-deductible charitable donations.

The NCFL sponsors the Grand National Speech and Debate Tournament held each year over Memorial Day weekend. It offers an array of events similar, but not identical, to those of the National Speech and Debate Association.

2020's NCFL Tournament 
Due to the Coronavirus Epidemic, the NCFL Tournament for 2020 has been cancelled. The organization still plans on holding their national event in 2021.

Events 
 Dramatic Performance – A ten-minute memorized performance of a dramatic or humorous selection of literature.
 Duo Interpretation of Literature – A ten-minute memorized performance of a dialogue, story, or script by two performers, who are required to maintain off-stage focus and to not look at or touch each other.
 Oral Interpretation of Literature – A ten-minute reading event, alternating between Prose and Poetry each round.
 Extemporaneous Speaking – A seven-minute analytical / persuasive speech on a question of current events, given with only 30 minutes' prior notice.
 Oratorical Declamation – A ten-minute memorized performance of a historical speech, commencement address or former competition speech to be delivered as if it were the speaker's own address.  Limited to freshmen and sophomores.
 Original Oratory – A ten-minute memorized original speech delivered to inspire or persuade the audience.
 Lincoln-Douglas Debate – 1v1 Value debate on a topic chosen by the NCFL specifically for the Grand National Tournament.  Four Minutes of preparation time is allotted to each debater per debate. The focus of the debate is on the philosophical ramifications of affirming or negating the resolution.
 Policy Debate – Two-person, switch-side, cross-examination debate, with five minutes of preparation time per team, on the national topic.
 Public Forum Debate –  A team event that advocates or rejects a position posed by the resolution. The focus of the debate is a clash of ideas in a persuasive manner that can be understood by a "lay" judge. Side and speaking order are assigned to each team every round in order to ensure students have the opportunity to debate both sides of a topic.
 Student Congress – Mock legislative sessions where students debate bills and resolutions submitted by schools from participating dioceses.

National tournament sites

 1952  Brooklyn, New York
 1953  Pittsburgh, Pennsylvania
 1954  Cleveland, Ohio
 1955  Brooklyn, New York
 1956  Pittsburgh, Pennsylvania
 1957  Philadelphia, Pennsylvania
 1958  Chicago, Illinois
 1959  Washington, District of Columbia
 1960  New York, New York
 1961  Baltimore, Maryland
 1962  Miami, Florida
 1963  Pittsburgh, Pennsylvania
 1964  Denver, Colorado
 1965  Brooklyn, New York
 1966  Miami, Florida
 1967  Camden, New Jersey
 1968  Chicago, Illinois
 1969  Washington, District of Columbia
 1970  Miami, Florida
 1971  New Orleans, Louisiana
 1972  Pittsburgh, Pennsylvania
 1973  Chicago, Illinois
 1974  New Orleans, Louisiana
 1975  Philadelphia, Pennsylvania
 1976  Detroit, Michigan
 1977  Milwaukee, Wisconsin
 1978  Washington, District of Columbia
 1979  Milwaukee, Wisconsin
 1980  Boston/Worcester, Massachusetts
 1981  New York, New York
 1982  Detroit, Michigan
 1983  Chicago, Illinois
 1984  Cincinnati, Ohio
 1985  Miami, Florida
 1986  Baltimore, Maryland
 1987  Buffalo, New York
 1988  New Orleans, Louisiana
 1989  Philadelphia, Pennsylvania
 1990  Chicago, Illinois
 1991  New York City, New York
 1992  Arlington, Virginia
 1993  Boca Raton, Florida
 1994  Oshkosh, Wisconsin
 1995  Chicago, Illinois
 1996  Topeka, Kansas
 1997  Baltimore, Maryland
 1998  Detroit, Michigan
 1999  Chicago, Illinois
 2000  Rochester, New York
 2001  New York City, New York
 2002  Pittsburgh, Pennsylvania
 2003  Arlington, Virginia
 2004  Boston, Massachusetts
 2005  Milwaukee, Wisconsin
 2006  Chicago, Illinois
 2007  Houston, Texas
 2008  Appleton, Wisconsin
 2009  Albany, New York
 2010  Omaha, Nebraska
 2011  Washington, D.C.
 2012  Baltimore, Maryland
 2013  Philadelphia, Pennsylvania
 2014  Chicago, Illinois
 2015  Fort Lauderdale, Florida
 2016  Sacramento, California
 2017  Louisville, Kentucky
 2018  Washington, D.C.
 2019 Milwaukee, Wisconsin
 2020 Chicago, Illinois
 2021  Online
 2022 Washington, D.C.
 2023 Louisville, Kentucky

National tournament director
Past National Tournament Directors

Past NCFL National Champions

Congressional Debate 

 1992 — J. Matthew Knight, Lake Highland Preparatory School, FL
 1994 — Chris Dorworth, Colonial High School, FL
 1995 – Bill Gallagher, Xavier High School, NY
 1996 – Duarte Gerladino, Brooklyn Technical High School, NY
 1997 – Sean Carmody, Pleasantville High School, NY
 1998 – Seth Green, Taravella High School, FL
 1999 – Matt Brennan, Iona Preparatory, NY
 2000 – Ian Amelkin, Stoneman Douglas High School
 2001 – Matt Spritz, Nova High School, FL
 2002 – Scott Jacobsin, Nova High School, FL
 2003 – Daniel Chapanian, Shrewsbury High School, MA
 2004 – Matt Turetzky, Nova High School, FL
 2005 – Results unavailable
 2006 – Colin Outerbridge, Trinity Preparatory, FL
 2007 – Sundeep Iyer, Ridge High School, NJ
 2008 – Ben Berkman, Nova High School
 2009 – Harlan Downs Tepper, Stuyvesant High School, NY
 2010 – Alex Smyk, Ridge High School, NJ
 2011 – Morgan Baskin, American Heritage, FL
 2012 –  Results unavailable
 2013 – Michael Cervino, Ridge High School, NJ
 2014 – Nic Gerard, Shrewsbury High School, MA
 2015 – Carla Troconis, East Chapel Hill, NC
 2016 - Katherine Klienle, Ridge High School, NJ
 2017 - Muhammad Naeen, Western High School, FL
 2018 - Gabrielle Cabeza, Western High School, FL
 2019 - Nathan Felmus, Bronx High School of Science, NY
 2021 - Olivia Pasquerella, Loyola School, NY
 2022 - Ben Bressette, Broad Run High School, VA

Lincoln-Douglas Debate 

 1988 – Lisa Nass, Miami Beach High School, Miami Beach, FL
 1989 – David Kennedy, Regis High School, New York, NY
 1990 – Jeremi Suri, Stuyvesant High School, New York, NY
 1991 – Mark Wunderlich, Walter Johnson High School, Bethesda, MD
 1992 – Jerry Vildostegui, Miami Beach High School, Miami Beach, FL
 1993 – Christopher J. Regan, Bishop Kearney High School, Irondequoit, NY
 1994 – Elizabeth Rogers, Shenendehowa High School, Clifton Park, NY
 1995 – Derek D. Smith, Winston Churchill High School, Potomac, MD
 1996 – Randall Martinez, Christopher Columbus High School, Miami, Florida
 1997 – Mac Hawkins, Lagrange High School, Lake Charles, LA
 1998 – Chetan Hertzig, Lexington High School, Lexington, MA
 1999 – Elizabeth O'Connor, Hunter College High School, New York, NY
 2000 – Kevin Farrell, Elk Grove High School, Chicago, Illinois
 2001 – Benjamin Rothstein, Milton Academy, Boston, MA
 2002 – Duncan Cooper, St. John’s Preparatory School, Boston, MA
 2003 – Nina Thanawala, Ridge High School, Basking Ridge, NJ
 2004 – Tara Tedrow, Celebration High School, Orlando, FL
 2005 – Tara Tedrow, Celebration High School, Orlando, FL
 2006 – Caitlin Halpern, W.T. Woodson High School, Arlington, VA
 2007 – Ryan Zehner, Saint Joseph's Preparatory School, Philadelphia, PA
 2008 – Ellen Noble, Walt Whitman High School, Bethesda, MD
 2009 – Karlyn Gorski, Perkioman Valley High School, Philadelphia, PA
 2010 – Stephanie Franklin, Walt Whitman High School, Bethesda, MD
 2011 – Allison Douglis, Ridge High School, Basking Ridge, NJ
 2012 – Katelyn Sheehan, Lake Braddock Secondary School, Arlington, VA
 2013 – Austin Cohen, Elk Lake High School, Dimock, PA
 2014 – Danny DeBois, Harrison High School, Harrison, NY
 2015 – Joey Schnide, Evanston Township High School, Evanston, IL
 2016 – Nicole Kastelic, Hawken School, Gates Mills, OH
 2017 – Maya Arora, Cape Fear Academy, Wilmington, NC
 2018 – Eva Lamberson, Canfield High School, Canfield, OH
 2019 – Maya Arora, Cape Fear Academy, Wilmington, NC
 2021 – Elias Altman, Myers Park High School, Charlotte, NC
 2022 – Ryan Si, Hawken School, Gates Mills, OH

Public Forum Debate 
 2007 – Dennis Howe and Robert Wyllie, Regis High School, New York, NY
 2008- Jonathan Freidman and Jeanine Sinan-Singh, Trinity Preparatory School, Florida
 2009 – Danny Welch and Will Miller, Lake Highland Preparatory School, Orlando, Florida
 2010 – Bud Peters and Thomas Pigott
 2011 – Brian Grumka and Thomas Pigott
 2012 - Kyle Newman and Michael Adams, Pinecrest HS, North Carolina
 2013 – Cameron Silvergate and Ethan Goldstein
 2014 – Tim Perevozchikov and Zach Kirsch, Hawken School, Ohio
 2015 – Ben Kessler and Jakob Urda, Stuyvesant HS, New York
 2016 - Eitan Ezra and Harrison Hurt, Poly Prep Country Day School, New York City, NY
 2017 - Atticus Nelson and Silas Nelson, DeSoto Central High School, Southaven, MS
 2018 - Alyson Brusie and Robert Linck, Oxbridge Academy of the Palm Beaches, West Palm Beach, FL
 2021 - William Pan and Arvindh Manian, Providence High School, Charlotte NC
 2022 - Alex Huang and Michael Hansen, Durham Academy, Durham, NC

Policy Debate 
 2014 - Anav Sharma and Aditya Rout, St. Francis Mountain View HS, Mountain View, CA
 2015 - Henry Walter and Ali Dastjerdi, Shawnee Mission East HS, Prairie Village, KS
 2016 - Saif Bajwa and Daniel Birzer, Blue Valley West HS, Overland Park, KS
 2017 – Stephen Lowe and Danish Kahn, Blue Valley Southwest HS, Overland Park, KS
 2018 - Sumaya Hussaini and Rachel Holzer, Blue Valley Southwest HS, Overland Park, KS
 2019 - Jet Semrick and Luke Bledsoe, Shawnee Mission East HS, Prairie Village, KS

See also 

 Competitive debate in the United States

References

External links 
 Speech and Debate Forensics Jobs Board Jobs Board dedicated to the forensics community.
 NCFL Home Page
 NCFL 2007 Grand National Tournament page
 National Catholic Forensic League on ForensicsWiki
 Past National Tournament Results
 NCFL Info and Profile

Organizations established in 1951
Student debating societies
Youth organizations based in the United States